La Voz (The Voice) is the debut solo album by Héctor Lavoe, It was released on 1975 under the label of Fania Records. 
It had two major hits on Latin America and U.S.: "El Todopoderoso" and "Mi Gente". The song "Mi Gente" featured in the soundtrack on the video game Grand Theft Auto: Vice City Stories on the fictitious Latin music radio station "Radio Espantoso".

Track listing

"El Todopoderoso" - 4:20
"Emborráchame de Amor" - 2:57 
"Paraíso de Dulzura" - 4:33 
"Un Amor de la Calle" - 3:21 
"Rompe Saragüey" - 6:31  
"Mucho Amor" - 2:08 
"Tus Ojos" - 3:33 
"Mi Gente" - 5:29

Personnel
Héctor Lavoe - Vocals
Tom Malone - Trombone  
José Rodríguez - Trombone
Ray Maldonado - Trumpet solo on "Mi Gente" 
Héctor Zarzuela - Trumpet solo on "Rompe Saragüey"
Milton Cardona - Conga
José Mangual, Jr. - Bongo
Eddie "Gua-gua" Rivera - Bass
Nicky Marrero - Timbal
Mark Dimond - Piano
Rubén Blades -  Backing vocals
Willie Colón - Backing vocals
Willie García - Backing vocals

References

Héctor Lavoe albums
1975 albums
Fania Records albums